Julius Meinl I (10 April 1824 – 24 December 1914) was an Austrian businessman and the founder of Julius Meinl AG, commonly known as Julius Meinl.

Meinl was born in Graslitz (Kraslice), Bohemia. He based his coffee roasting company in Vienna, Austria (then Austria-Hungary).

He died in Vienna at age 90.

See also
 Meinl (disambiguation)

1824 births
1914 deaths
People from Kraslice
People from the Kingdom of Bohemia
German Bohemian people
19th-century Austrian people
Austrian businesspeople
Austrian drink industry businesspeople
Businesspeople in coffee
Austrian people of German Bohemian descent